The 43rd SİYAD Awards, presented by the Turkish Film Critics Association (SİYAD), honored the best Turkish films of 2010 and took place on , at the Türker İnanoğlu Maslak Show Center in Istanbul, Turkey.

Awards and nominations

Best Film
 Winner: Cosmos produced by Ömer Atay
 Five Cities produced by Funda Alp and Onur Ünlü
 Majority produced by Önder Çakar, Sevil Demirci and Seren Yüce
 Honey produced by Semih Kaplanoğlu
 Dark Cloud produced by Enis Köstepen, Yamaç Okur and Nadir Öperli

Best Director
 Winner: Reha Erdem for Cosmos
 Semih Kaplanoğlu for Honey
 Theron Patterson for Dark Cloud
 Onur Ünlü for Five Cities
 Seren Yüce for Majority

Mahmut Tali Award for Best Script
 Winner: Seren Yüce for Majority
 Selim Demirdelen for The Crossing
 Reha Erdem for Cosmos
 Semih Kaplanoğlu and Orçun Köksal for Honey
 Onur Ünlü for Five Cities

Cahide Sonku Award for Best Actress
 Winner: Sevinç Erbulak for Sleeping Princess
 Demet Akbağ for Eyyvah Eyvah
 Sezin Akbaşoğulları for The Crossing
 Esme Madra for Majority
 Türkü Turan for Cosmos

Best Actor
 Winner: Bartu Küçükçağlayan for Majority
 Tansu Biçer for Five Cities
 Güven Kıraç for The Crossing
 Reha Özcan for Dark Cloud
  for Cosmos

Best Supporting Actress
 Winner: Nihal Koldaş for Majority
 Yeşim Ceren Bozoğlu for Dark Cloud
 Ceyda Düvenci for Dragon Trap
 Selen Uçer for A Step into the Darkness
 Nurcan Ülger for Haze

Best Supporting Actor
 Winner: Settar Tanrıöğen for Majority
 Erdal Beşikçioğlu for Honey
 Genco Erkal for Sleeping Princess
 Volga Sorgu for Black Dogs Barking
 Cem Yılmaz for Hunting Season

Best Cinematogropher
 Winner: Florent Herry for Cosmos
 Uğur İçbak for Hunting Season
 Barış Özbiçer for Honey
 Barış Özbiçer for Majority
 Ercan Özkan for Haze

Best Music
 Winner: Selim Demirdelen for The Crossing
 Alp Erkin Çakmak and Barış Diri for Black Dogs Barking
 Tamer Çıray for Hunting Season
 Herve Guyader and Reha Erdem for Cosmos
 Cenap Oğuz for Five Cities

Best Editor
 Winner: Reha Erdem for Cosmos
 Ahmet Can Çakırca for Five Cities
 Selim Demirdelen for The Crossing
 Ayhan Ergürsel, Semih Kaplanoğlu and Suzan Hande Güneri for Honey
 Mary Stephen for Majority

Best Art Director
 Winner: Ömer Atay for Cosmos
 Meral Efe for Majority
 Naz Erayda for Honey
 Elif Taşçıoğlu for Haze
 Hakan Yarkın for Yahşi Batı

Honorary Awards
 Yusuf Kurçenli (filmmaker)
 Tuncel Kurtiz (actor)
 Cahit Berkay (musician)

See also
 4th Yeşilçam Awards
 Turkish films of 2010
 2010 in film

References

External links
  for SİYAD (Turkish)

2011 in Turkey
2010 film awards
Turkish film awards
February 2011 events in Turkey